Franziska Junge (born 1981 in Zschopau, East Germany) is a German actress for theatre, film, television as well as a singer.

Biography 
She took screen-acting lessons with Jordan Beswick (New York) and completed the master class for camera work "The Naked Face" with David Penn (London). Besides her work in film and television, Franziska Junge also acts in theatre. Claus Peymann brought her to the Berliner Ensemble while she was still studying in 2006. There Junge had the opportunity to realize a German premiere of the solo play "Kabarett der letzten Hoffnung" by Wladimir Alekseewic Klim (Klimenko) under the direction of Makedoniy Kiselev. She took part in the commissioned play "Pffft ... oder der letzte Tango am Telefon" by George Tabori under the direction of Martin Wuttke, travelled around the world with the successful production of The Threepenny Opera under the direction of Robert Wilson and was allowed to take over the role of Lena in Leonce und Lena with music by Herbert Grönemeyer; also under the direction of Wilson.

From 2009 to 2017, she was a member of the ensemble at Schauspiel Frankfurt.

Filmography 

 Die fehlende Stunde (2004)
 Eine Chance für die Liebe (2005)
 Das Leben des Friedrich Schiller (2005)
 Mustervater 2 – Opa allein zu Haus (2007)
 Das Scherbengericht (2007)
 Last Night of Baby Gun (Die letzte Nacht der Baby Gun) Short film for cinema (2013)
 Labyrinth of Lies (2013)
 Tatort: Das Haus am Ende der Straße (2013)
 Tatort: Hinter dem Spiegel (2014)
 Tatort: Wer bin ich? (2015)
 Dead Man Working (2015)
 Long Live Death (Tatort: Es lebe der Tod) (2016)
 Im Wald Kurzfilm für Kino (2017)
 Ein Fall für zwei (2017)
 Unser Kind (2017)
 Letzte Spur Berlin (Episode: Verspielt) (2017)
 Wolfsland (Fernsehreihe) (Episode: Heimsuchung) (2019)
 Tatort: Gefangen (2020)

Theatre  

Schauspiel Frankfurt (2009-2017)

 Phèdre by Jean Racine – Oenone – director: Oliver Reese
 Tartuffe by Molière – Elmire – director: Staffan Valdemar Holm
 Traumnovelle by Arthur Schnitzler – Albertine – director: Bastian Kraft
 Liebelei by Arthur Schnitzler – Mizzi – director: Stephan Kimmig
 Salome by Oscar Wilde – Herodias – director: Günter Krämer
 Making of::Marilyn - Marilyn - director: Bernhard Mikeska
 Dekalog by Krzysztof Kieślowski – Ewa, Magda, Dorota – director: Christopher Rüping
 Glaube Liebe Hoffnung by Ödön von Horváth – Maria – director: Andreas Kriegenburg
 Frankfurt by Rainald Grebe – Storch, Kleist etc. – director: Rainald Grebe
 Nach dem Fest by Hans Op de Beeck – director: Hans Op de Beeck
 Die Wiedervereinigung der beiden Koreas by Joël Pommerat – director: Oliver Reese
 Demons by Fyodor Dostoevsky – Marja Timofejewna Lebjadkina, Lisaweta Tuschina – director: Sebastian Hartmann
 The Tempest by William Shakespeare – Ariel – director: Andreas Kriegenburg
 August: Osage County (Eine Familie) by Tracy Letts – Karen – director: Oliver Reese
 Three Days In The Country by Patrick Marber – Natalja – director: Andreas Kriegenburg

Berliner Ensemble (2006-2019)

 Die Jungfrau from Orleans by Friedrich Schiller – Agnes Sorel – director: Claus Peymann
 Kabarett der letzten Hoffnung by Wladimir Alekseewic Klim (Klimenko) – One Woman Show – director: Makedoniy Kiselev
 Pffft … oder der letzte Tango am Telefon by George Tabori – Chorus – director: Martin Wuttke
 Die Dreigroschenoper by Bertolt Brecht – Dolly – director: Robert Wilson
 Leonce and Lena by Georg Büchner – Lena – director: Robert Wilson
 The Threepenny Opera by Bertolt Brecht – Lucy Brown – director: Robert Wilson
 Linda Vista (Wheeler) from Tracy Letts – Anita – director: Oliver Reese

Volksbühne Berlin (2012)

 The Sandman (Der Sandman) from E.T.A. Hoffmann – director: Sebastian Klink

Kampnagel Hamburg (2010-2012)

 Dunkle Mädchen & MusicHall präsentieren Socrate by Erik Satie – Sokrates – director: Kommando Himmelfahrt
 Leviathan oder: Stoff, Form und Gewalt eines Staates by Kommando Himmelfahrt

Schauspiel Leipzig (2005)

 Hertel’s Waits for Franzy (concerts with songs from Tom Waits) – direction and arrangements: Thomas Hertel

Bregenzer Festspiele (2001-2003)

 La Bohème by Giacomo Puccini – director: Richard Jones & Anthony McDonald
 West Side Story by Leonard Bernstein – director: Francesca Zambello

Prinzregententheater München (2001-2003)

 Stella by Johann Wolfgang von Goethe – Lucie Sommer- director: Florentine Klepper
 On the Town by Leonard Bernstein – Lucie Schmeeler – director: Gil Mehmert
 Stumm&Zwang, One-Woman-Show – director: Franziska Junge

References

External links 

 Franziska Junge personal website
 

1981 births
Living people
German film actresses
21st-century German actresses
German stage actresses